Turn Records is an independent record label founded in 1999 in Santa Clara, California by Jeff Walsh, who was a DJ at KSCU (Santa Clara University) at the time. The label's first release was by local band the Contrail, and Turn has gone put out numerous releases, most notably More Deep Cuts by Thee More Shallows in the US.

Bands and artists 
 Bunkbed
 Calling All Monsters
 The Candies
 Citizens Here and Abroad
 The Contrail
 Dealership
 Desert City Soundtrack
 The Dying Californian
 Nervous and the Kid
 The Rum Diary
 Three More Shallows
 Track Star
 Xiu Xiu

External links 
 Official site
 MySpace page

American record labels